Ludovic Fabregas (born 1 July 1996) is a French handball player for FC Barcelona and the French national team.

Individual awards
All-Star Pivot at the Olympic Games: 2020
All-Star Pivot of the World Championship: 2021, 2023
 All-Star Pivot of the Youth World Championship: 2015
All-Star Pivot of EHF Champions League: 2021
 Best Young Player of EHF Champions League: 2019

References

External links

1996 births
Living people
French male handball players
Sportspeople from Perpignan
Olympic handball players of France
Handball players at the 2016 Summer Olympics
Medalists at the 2016 Summer Olympics
Olympic silver medalists for France
Olympic medalists in handball
Montpellier Handball players
Expatriate handball players
French expatriate sportspeople in Spain
Liga ASOBAL players
FC Barcelona Handbol players
Handball players at the 2020 Summer Olympics
Medalists at the 2020 Summer Olympics
Olympic gold medalists for France
French people of Spanish descent